Crassispira monilecosta is a species of sea snail, a marine gastropod mollusk in the family Pseudomelatomidae.

Description

Distribution
This marine species occurs off Angola

References

 Fernandes, F., Rolán, E. & Otero-Schmitt, J. (1995) The genus Crassispira (Gastropoda, Turridae) in West Africa. Journal of Conchology, 35, 283–301.

External links
 
 

}

Endemic fauna of Angola
monilecosta
Gastropods described in 1995